Olympic High School is a secondary school located in Bremerton, Washington, United States. It is one of six secondary schools in the Central Kitsap School District.  OHS educates grades 9-12. Course offerings include several Advanced Placement courses, a College in the High School program in partnership with Central Washington University, and an advanced Career and Technical Education program called Project Lead the Way. The school also offers students programs in vocal and instrumental music, and Sports medicine.

In 2017, community support allowed the school to begin a major modernization project. The center of the building will be demolished. A two-story building will be constructed in its place. The addition will include career and technical classrooms, an updated library, auditorium and commons areas. The project will not be complete by fall 2018.

The school's main gym is also the home venue for the Kitsap Admirals of the American Basketball Association and International Basketball League.

Demographics
2018-2019 school year

In the 2018-2019 School year, the total number of students enrolled is 1,201. the current racial demographics for the 2018–2019 school year are as follows: 49% White, 23% Mixed, 14% Hispanic, 8% Asian, 5% African American, 2% Hawaiian Native/Pacific Islander, 0.4% American Indian/Alaskan Native. The gender distribution of students is that of 47% Female, 52.6% Male, and 0.4% other. 33% of students qualify for free or reduced lunches.

Notable alumni
Scott Forstall, software engineer, best known for leading the original software development team for the iPhone and iPad.
John Coker, professional basketball player
Ben Gibbard, musician, frontman of Death Cab for Cutie
Corey Lewis, comic book creator
George Quibuyen, vocalist of Blue Scholars
Bree Schaaf, Olympic bobsledder
Christian Welp, professional basketball player

References

External links
 
 OSPI school report card, 2010-2011

High schools in Kitsap County, Washington
Public high schools in Washington (state)